Folkungavallen  is a football stadium in Linköping, Sweden  and the home stadium for the football teams Linköpings FC and FK Linköping. Folkungavallen has a total capacity of 5,500 spectators.

References 

Football venues in Sweden
Buildings and structures in Linköping
Sport in Linköping